His Lordship Goes to Press is a 1938 British comedy film directed by Maclean Rogers and starring June Clyde, Hugh Williams, Louise Hampton and Leslie Perrins. The film follows an American reporter who goes to work on a farm for an assignment, where a case of mistaken identity ensues.

Cast
 June Clyde as Valerie Lee
 Hugh Williams as Lord Bill Wilmer
 Louise Hampton as Mrs Hodges
 Leslie Perrins as Sir Richard Swingleton
 Romney Brent as Pinkie Butler
 Aubrey Mallalieu as Hardcastle
 Zillah Bateman as Mrs Tukes

References

External links
 

1938 films
1938 comedy films
British comedy films
Films directed by Maclean Rogers
British black-and-white films
1930s English-language films
1930s British films